The 2014 European Korfball Championship was held in Portugal from October 25 to November 2, with 16 national teams in competition.

The tournament also served as a European qualifier for the 2015 Korfball World Championship, with the top ten nations qualifying for the world championship.

Group stage
The group stages took place in Maia. The IKF had implemented a new format of qualifying from the group stages. In these European Championships, the top eight nations were seeded in to pools A & B. In these pools the top three teams qualified for the quarter-finals. The other nations in pools C & D needed to finish top of their pool in order to reach the quarter-finals.

Group A

|}
Key: G denotes win by golden goal.

Group B

|}

Group C

|}
Key: G denotes win by golden goal.

Group D

|}
Key: G denotes win by golden goal.

Knockout stage

1st–8th place play-offs

Key: G denotes win by golden goal.

9th–16th place play-offs

Final standing

External links
Official website

European Korfball Championship
2014 in korfball
2014 in Portuguese sport
International sports competitions hosted by Portugal
Korfball in Portugal